Sunao (written: 直, 淳, 愿, 順, 須直, 直男 or すなお in hiragana) is a masculine Japanese given name. Notable people with the name include:

, Japanese manga artist
, Japanese footballer
, Japanese swimmer
, Japanese anime director
, Japanese Go player
Sunao Sonoda (1914–1984), Japanese politician
, Japanese pathologist
, pen-name of Sunao Matsumoto, Japanese writer

Japanese masculine given names